The Chachapoyas antpitta (Grallaria gravesi) is a species of bird in the family Grallariidae. It is endemic to Peru. It is a member of the rufous antpitta species complex and was first described by Morton L. Isler, R. Terry Chesser, Mark B. Robbins and Peter A. Hosner in 2020.

Taxonomy 
The Chachapoyas antpitta was described as a species on the basis of differences in plumage, vocalizations and genetics. It forms a sister group with Panao antpitta and the Junín antpitta. The Chachapoyas antpitta was formerly believed to be part of G. rufula obscura (now the Junín antpitta, G. obscura).

The specific name, gravesi, are named for Dr. Gary R. Graves, an ornithologist whose work contributed to the discovery of the Chachapoya antpitta.

Distribution and habitat 
The Chachapoyas antpitta is endemic to the eastern slope of the Peruvian Andes in the departments of Amazonas, San Martín and Huánuco. They inhabit humid montane forests and forest edges.

They are separated from the closely related Panao antpitta by the Huallaga River.

References 

Grallaria
Endemic fauna of Peru
Birds of Peru